Eucalyptus ancophila is a tree endemic to a small area of New South Wales in eastern Australia. It has grey "ironbark", glossy green, lance-shaped leaves, flower buds arranged in a branching inflorescence with seven oval to diamond-shaped buds in each umbel, white flowers and conical or barrel-shaped fruit.

Description
Young plants and coppice regrowth have four-sided stems and egg-shaped, later lance-shaped leaves, that are a paler shade of green on the lower side. The flower buds are arranged in a branching inflorescence, each branch with an umbel of seven buds. Flowering has been recorded in November and the flowers are white.

Taxonomy and naming
Eucalyptus ancophila was first formally described in 1990 by Lawrie Johnson and Ken Hill and the description was published in Telopea from a specimen collected near Kempsey. The specific epithet (ancophila) is from the Ancient Greek words ankos meaning "mountain glen" or "valley" and philos, meaning "dear one" or "friend" referring to this species' habitat.

Distribution and habitat
This eucalypt usually grows along creeks or in the bottom of valleys in the Kempsey and Bellingen districts.

References

ancophila
Myrtales of Australia
Flora of New South Wales
Trees of Australia
Plants described in 2003